Albert Spencer may refer to:
 Albert Spencer, 7th Earl Spencer (1892–1975), British peer
 Albert Spencer (footballer), English footballer
 Albert Spencer (gymnast) (1897–?), British gymnast
 Albert Henry Spencer (1886–1971), Australian bookseller